The 2013–14 Kentucky Wildcats women's basketball team represented University of Kentucky during the 2013–14 NCAA Division I women's basketball season. The Wildcats, led by seventh year head coach Matthew Mitchell, played their home games at the Memorial Coliseum and were members of the Southeastern Conference. They finished with a record of 26–9 overall, 10–6 in SEC play for a fourth-place finish. They lost in the 2014 SEC women's basketball tournament to Tennessee. They were invited to the 2014 NCAA Division I women's basketball tournament which they defeated Wright State in the first round, Syracuse in the second round before losing to Baylor in the sweet sixteen.

Roster

Schedule

|-
!colspan=9| Exhibition

|-
!colspan=9| Regular Season

|-
!colspan=9| SEC tournament

|-
!colspan=9| NCAA women's tournament

Source

Rankings

See also
2013–14 Kentucky Wildcats men's basketball team

References

Kentucky Wildcats women's basketball seasons
Kentucky
Kentucky Wildcats women's b
Kentucky Wildcats women's b
Kentucky